The King of Kings is a 1927 American silent epic film produced and directed by Cecil B. DeMille. It depicts the last weeks of Jesus before his crucifixion and stars H. B. Warner in the lead role.

Featuring the opening and resurrection scenes in two-color Technicolor, the film is the second in DeMille's Biblical trilogy, preceded by The Ten Commandments (1923) and followed by The Sign of the Cross (1932).

Plot

Mary Magdalene is portrayed as a wild courtesan, entertaining many men around her. Upon learning that Judas is with a carpenter she rides out on her chariot drawn by zebras to get him back. Peter is introduced as the Giant apostle, and we see the future gospel writer Mark as a child who is healed by Jesus. Mary, the mother of Jesus, is shown as a beautiful and saintly woman who is a mother to all her son's followers. The first sight of Jesus is through the eyesight of a little girl, whom he heals. He is surrounded by a halo. Mary Magdelene arrives afterwards and talks to Judas, who reveals that he is only staying with Jesus in hopes of being made a high official after Jesus becomes the king of kings. Jesus casts the Seven Deadly Sins out of Mary Magdalene in a multiple exposure sequence.

Jesus is also shown resurrecting Lazarus and healing the little children. Some humor is derived when one girl asks if he can heal broken legs, and, when he says yes, she gives him a legless doll. Jesus smiles and repairs the doll. The crucifixion is foreshadowed when Jesus, having helped a poor family, wanders through the father's carpentry shop, and, himself a carpenter's son, he briefly helps carve a piece of wood. When a sheet covering the object is removed, it is revealed to be a cross towering over Jesus.

Jesus and his apostles enter Jerusalem, where Judas incites the people and rallies them to proclaim Jesus King of the Jews. Jesus, however, renounces all claims of being an Earthly king. Caiaphas the High Priest is also angry at Judas for having led people to a man whom he sees as a false prophet. Meanwhile, Jesus drives away Satan, who had offered him an Earthly kingdom, and he protects a woman caught in adultery. The words he draws in the sand are revealed to be the sins the accusers themselves committed.

Judas, desperate to save himself from Caiaphas, agrees to turn over Jesus. Noticeably at the Last Supper, when Jesus distributes the bread and wine saying that they are his body and blood, Judas refuses to eat or drink. Towards the end, Mary confronts her son and tells him to flee from the danger that is coming. Jesus replies that it must be done for the salvation of all peoples.

Jesus goes to the Garden of Gethsemane where he is soon captured by the Roman soldiers and betrayed by Judas. Judas' life is saved, but, upon seeing that Jesus is going to be killed as a result, he is horrified. Judas takes a rope that the Romans had used to bind Jesus' wrists and runs off. Jesus is beaten and then presented by Pontius Pilate to the crowd. Mary pleads for the life of her son and Mary Magdalene speaks for him but Caiaphas bribes the crowd to shout against Jesus.

Jesus is taken away to be crucified, though he pauses on the Via Dolorosa to heal a group of cripples in an alley, despite his weakened condition. Jesus is crucified and his enemies throw insults at him. (One woman even anachronistically eats popcorn and smiles with glee at Jesus' crucifixion.) When Jesus does die, however, a great earthquake comes up. The tree where Judas had hanged himself, with the rope used to bind Jesus's wrists, is swallowed up amidst bursts of hellfire. The sky turns black, lightning strikes, the wind blows, the people who had mocked Jesus run in terror, and the veil covering the Holy of Holies in the Jerusalem Temple is torn in two.

The tumult ends when Mary looks up at heaven and asks God to forgive the world for the death of their son. The chaos ends and the sun shines. Jesus is taken down from the cross and is buried. On the third day, he rises from the dead as promised. To emphasize the importance of the resurrection, this scene from an otherwise black and white film is shot in color. Jesus goes to the Apostles and tells them to spread his message to the world. He tells them "I am with you always" as the scene shifts to a modern city to show that Jesus still watches over his followers.

Many of the film's intertitles are quotes (or paraphrases) from Scripture, often with chapter and verse accompanying.

Cast

H. B. Warner as Jesus
Dorothy Cumming as Mary, the mother of Jesus
Ernest Torrence as Peter
Joseph Schildkraut as Judas Iscariot
James Neill as James the Great
Joseph Striker as John the Apostle
Robert Edeson as Matthew the Apostle
Sidney D'Albrook as Thomas, the Doubter
 David Imboden as Andrew – a Fisherman
Charles Belcher as Philip the Apostle 
 Clayton Packard as Bartholomew the Apostle
 Robert Ellsworth as Simon – the Zealot
 Charles Requa	as James the Less
 John T. Prince as Thaddeus
Jacqueline Logan as Mary Magdalene
Rudolph Schildkraut as Caiaphas – High Priest of Israel
Sam De Grasse as Pharisee
Casson Ferguson as Scribe
Victor Varconi as Pontius Pilate
Majel Coleman as Proculla – Wife of Pilate
Montagu Love as Roman Centurion
William Boyd as Simon of Cyrene
Micky Moore as Mark
Theodore Kosloff as Malchus – Captain of the High Priest's Guard
George Siegmann as Barabbas
Julia Faye	as Martha
 Josephine Norman as Mary of Bethany
Kenneth Thomson as Lazarus
 Alan Brooks as Satan
 Viola Louie as Adulterous Woman
 Muriel McCormac	as Blind Girl
Clarence Burton as Dysmas – the Repentant Thief
Jim Mason as Gestas – the Unrepentant Thief 
May Robson	as Mother of Gestas
Dot Farley	as Maidservant of Caiaphas
 Hector V. Sarno as Galilean Carpenter
 Leon Holmes as Imbecile Boy
Otto Lederer as Eber – a Pharisee
Bryant Washburn as Young Roman
Lionel Belmore as Roman Noble
Monte Collins as Rich Judeaean
Lucio Flamma as Gallant of Galilee 
Sôjin Kamiyama as Prince Of Persia 
André Cheron as Wealthy Merchant
Willy Castello as Babylonian Noble
Noble Johnson as Charioteer
Jim Farley as Executioner
James Dime as a Roman soldier

Cast notes
Sally Rand was an extra in the film, years before becoming notorious for her "fan dance" at the 1933 World's Fair.
Writer Ayn Rand (no relation to Sally Rand) also was an extra in the film, and met her future husband Frank O'Connor on set.
Micky Moore was the last surviving cast member at his death in 2013.

Production

A giant gate built for this film was later used in the 1933 film King Kong, and was among the sets torched for the "burning of Atlanta" in Gone with the Wind (1939). Other sets and costumes were re-used for the 1965 Elvis Presley film, Harum Scarum.

The movie has two Technicolor sequences, the beginning and the resurrection scene, which use the two-color process invented by Herbert Kalmus.

Release
The King of Kings was the first movie that premiered at the noted Grauman's Chinese Theater in Los Angeles, California on May 18, 1927. The film was screened there again on May 24, 1977, to commemorate the theater's 50th anniversary.

In what is considered one of the earliest applications of market segmentation to film promotion, students ranging from elementary to high school were dismissed early to attend afternoon screenings of the film. The King of Kings was seen by around 500 million viewers between its original release in 1927 and the remake in 1961.

Critical reception
The King of Kings received rave reviews from the critics. The Film Daily stated: "There can be said nothing but praise for the reverence and appreciation with which the beautiful story has been developed. . . 'The King of Kings' is tremendous from every standpoint. It is the finest piece of screen craftsmanship ever turned out by DeMille". Photoplay described the film as "Cecil B. DeMille's finest motion picture effort" and thought he took "the most difficult and exalted theme in the world's history—the story of Jesus Christ—and transcribed it intelligently and ably to the screen." Norbert Lusk of Picture Play believed "'The King of Kings' is Cecil B. DeMille's masterpiece, and is among the greatest of all pictures. It is a sincere and reverent visualization of the last three years in the life of Christ, produced on a scale of tasteful magnificence, finely acted by the scores in it, and possessed of moments of poignant beauty and unapproachable drama. This is a picture that will never become outmoded."

Accolades
In June 1927, Photoplay named the film one of "The Best Pictures of the Month". For their work in The King of Kings, H. B. Warner, Victor Varconi, Rudolph Schildkraut, and Ernest Torrence were included among "The Best Performances of the Month".

In 2008, AFI nominated this film for its Top 10 Epic Films list. It is widely considered to be among the most popular Hollywood biblical epic films depicting the life of Christ.

Lawsuit
In 1928, actress Valeska Surratt and scholar Mirza Ahmad Sohrab sued DeMille for stealing the scenario for The King of Kings from them. The case went to trial in February 1930 but eventually was settled without additional publicity. Surratt, who had left films to return to the stage in 1917, appeared to be unofficially blacklisted after the suit.

See also
 King of Kings (1961 film) directed by Nicholas Ray
 List of early color feature films

References

External links

 
 
 
 
King of Kings: Showman of Piety an essay by Peter Matthews at the Criterion Collection
 Alternate lobby art

1927 films
1920s color films
American epic films
American silent feature films
Articles containing video clips
Film portrayals of Jesus' death and resurrection
Films directed by Cecil B. DeMille
Films partially in color
Portrayals of the Virgin Mary in film
Religious epic films
Silent films in color
Cultural depictions of Judas Iscariot
Cultural depictions of Pontius Pilate
Pathé Exchange films
Caiaphas
Portrayals of Mary Magdalene in film
Cultural depictions of Saint Peter
1920s American films
Silent adventure films